E. G. Daily (born September 11, 1961) also known as Elizabeth Daily, is an American actress, singer-songwriter, and composer.

Daily is best known for her animation voice roles as Tommy Pickles on Rugrats and its spin-off All Grown Up!, Buttercup on The Powerpuff Girls, Rudy Tabootie on ChalkZone, and Julius on Julius Jr. She also voiced the title character in the live-action film Babe: Pig in the City and Bamm-Bamm Rubble in the live-action film The Flintstones.

Daily is also known for her roles in a variety of live-action films such as Valley Girl, Dogfight, No Small Affair, Fandango, Streets of Fire, The Devil's Rejects, My Sister's Keeper, and Pee-wee Herman's potential girlfriend in Pee-wee's Big Adventure.

As a singer, Daily has released four studio albums: Wild Child (1985), Lace Around the Wound (1989), Tearing Down the Walls (1999), and Changing Faces (2008).

Career

Voice acting
Daily has voiced animated characters such as Tommy Pickles in Rugrats, a role that she reprised for its revival on Paramount+, and actually was in the middle of labor while recording a few of his lines for an episode, and Freefall / Roxy Spaulding in the film Gen¹³ and Private Isabel "Dizzy" Flores in Roughnecks: Starship Troopers Chronicles. She provided the voice for the lead role in the live-action feature film Babe: Pig in the City, replacing Christine Cavanaugh. More recently from 2013 to 2015, she played the title character on the Nick Jr. TV show Julius Jr., and was recently Hinoka from Fire Emblem Fates.

Live-action roles
Besides doing voice-overs, Daily has acted in film and on TV. She played Sandy Burns on the PBS series The Righteous Apples from 1980 to 1981. In 1985, she starred as Dottie in Pee-wee's Big Adventure, as Loryn in Valley Girl, and as a singer in the comedy Better Off Dead. She also appeared on such television shows as Laverne & Shirley, CHiPs, Fame and Friends. She was also in the music video for Rod Stewart's song "Young Turks" as Patti, one of the runaway teens. She has been cast in several Rob Zombie films, most recently in 2015 as Sex-Head in Rob Zombie's 31, the woman on the side of Torsten Voges, who plays Death-Head.

Music

Daily signed with A&M Records in 1985, working with Madonna's frequent collaborators John "Jellybean" Benitez and Stephen Bray. In 1986, that label released the R&B/Rock single "Say It, Say It". The song made it to No. 70 on the Billboard Hot 100, and the No. 1 spot on the Hot Dance Music/Club Play chart. (Other versions of the song appeared as early as 1981). Her songs "Shake It Up" and "I'm Hot Tonight" were included in the soundtrack to the film Scarface. Those same songs were later included in the lineup of fictional radio station Flashback 95.6 FM in the Grand Theft Auto III video game. They were also included in the Scarface: The World Is Yours video game, based on the 1983 film. Her hit "Love in the Shadows" was featured in the films Thief of Hearts and Circuit.

Also in 1985, she provided backup vocals for The Human League frontman Philip Oakey's debut solo album, Philip Oakey & Giorgio Moroder. That same year, she appeared in the comedy film Better Off Dead, singing the songs "One Way Love (Better Off Dead)" and "A Little Luck" as a member of a band performing at a high school dance. Both songs were included on the soundtrack album credited to E. G. Daily. She performed a song on The Breakfast Club soundtrack called "Waiting".

In 1987, she released the song "Mind over Matter", which is featured in the film Summer School. Daily plays guitar, harmonica, keyboards, and percussion instruments. In her 1989 song, "Some People", from her Lace Around the Wound album, produced by Lotti Golden and Tommy Faragher, she plays guitar and harmonica. In 1999, she released her third studio album Tearing Down the Walls.

Daily released a song titled "Changing Faces" in 2003. The song was used on the end credits of Rugrats Go Wild. She also released a single titled "Beautiful" which she made available through iTunes on April 29, 2008. She also sang the song "Dawn's Theme", which was used at the end of the movie Streets. From 2003 to 2011, Daily did the voice-over of Jake Harper singing the Two and a Half Men song.

Her genres are country, dance, pop, and rock.

In fall 2013, Daily sang as a contestant on the fifth season of the NBC reality show The Voice. In the blind audition broadcast on September 24, 2013, she sang "Breathe" from Faith Hill. Two of the four judges on the show, Blake Shelton and CeeLo Green, turned around their chairs for her. She chose to be on Team Blake. Daily proceeded to win her battle in the show's battle rounds singing the song "Something to Talk About". She lost in the Knockout Rounds, with a performance of Bonnie Raitt's "I Can't Make You Love Me".

Personal life
Daily previously dated actor Jon-Erik Hexum, and was his girlfriend at the time of his accidental death in 1984. She subsequently spent a short time living with her Valley Girl co-star Deborah Foreman for emotional support.

Daily married poker player Rick Salomon in 1995. They have two daughters, named Hunter and Tyson, before divorcing in 2000.

She is Jewish.

Filmography

Film

Short films

Television and animation

Video games

Discography

Albums

Singles

See also
 List of number-one dance hits (United States)
 List of artists who reached number one on the US Dance chart

References

External links
 
 
 
 
 

Living people
Actresses from Los Angeles
American dance musicians
American film actresses
American television actresses
American video game actresses
American voice actresses
American women pop singers
American women singer-songwriters
Comedians from California
Musicians from Los Angeles
Singer-songwriters from California
The Voice (franchise) contestants
20th-century American actresses
21st-century American actresses
20th-century American comedians
21st-century American comedians
20th-century American singers
21st-century American singers
20th-century American women singers
21st-century American women singers
1961 births
Jewish American actresses